The 1993 Asia Cup would have been the fifth edition of the tournament, however  was cancelled due to strained political relations between India and Pakistan. It was due to be held in Pakistan.

See also
 Asia Cup

References

External links

Asia Cup
Asia Cup, 1993
1993 in Pakistani sport